Benjamin Björklund (Born 1986 in Trollhättan, Sweden) is a Swedish painter. Björklund is a self-taught artist whose work includes classic figurative painting.  He primarily paints people and animals, with the subjects often being completely alone. His work is inspired by the cold mood of the Skagen Painters.

Personal life
Björklund studied to become a veterinary technician and has briefly worked as both a prison night guard and a psychiatric nurse.

Exhibitions

Solo exhibitions

 2012 Trollhättans Konsthall
 2014 Studio The, London

Group exhibitions

 2012 Liljevalchs Vårsalong

References

External links
 Official Website
 Official Instagram

21st-century Swedish painters
21st-century male artists
1986 births
Living people